César Ignacio Pérez Maldonado (born 29 November 2002) is a Chilean footballer who plays as a midfielder for Unión La Calera.

Club career
Pérez came to Magallanes youth system in 2013 and joined the first team in 2019. After spending four seasons in the Primera B de Chile with Magallanes, for the 2022 season he moved to Unión La Calera in the Chilean Primera División.

International career
At youth level, Pérez represented Chile at under-15 level in the 2017 South American Championship and Chile U17 at both the 2019 South American Championship, where Chile was the runner-up, and the 2019 FIFA World Cup.

At under-20 level, he represented Chile in the Granja Comary International Tournament, a friendly championship in Teresópolis, Brazil, playing all the matches against Peru U20, Bolivia U20, and Brazil U20.

On 31 August 2022, he represented Chile at under-23 level in a 1–0 win against Peru U23.

At senior level, he was called up to the training microcycle in March 2021 of Chile by the coach Martín Lasarte along with his fellow Julián Alfaro.

References

External links
 
 

2002 births
Footballers from Santiago
Living people
Chilean footballers
Chile youth international footballers
Chile under-20 international footballers
Deportes Magallanes footballers
Unión La Calera footballers
Magallanes footballers
Primera B de Chile players
Chilean Primera División players
Association football midfielders